Torfmoorsee is a lake in North Rhine-Westphalia, Germany.

Lakes of North Rhine-Westphalia